Warhost of Vastmark is volume three of The Wars of Light and Shadow by Janny Wurts.

Warhost of Vastmark is the second half of Arc II of The Wars of Light and Shadow. The first half being Ships of Merior.

Note: The Warhost of Vastmark is only available in paperback as the US Hard Cover version of Ships of Merior contained all of Arc II.

External links
Warhost of Vastmark Webpage
Warhost of Vastmark Excerpt

1995 American novels
American fantasy novels
Wars of Light and Shadow
HarperCollins books